Stropharia inuncta is a species of mushroom native to Europe.

References

Strophariaceae
Fungi described in 1828
Fungi of Europe
Taxa named by Elias Magnus Fries